The second and final series of So You Think You Can Dance began on 26 March 2011 and ended on 11 June 2011.   Tapper Matt Flint took first place and the title "Britain's Favourite Dancer", as well as a prize package including £50,000 and a trip to Hollywood, where he performed in the U.S. series’ eighth season finale.

Auditions
The show hosted auditions in Manchester on 17 October 2010, Glasgow on 19 October 2010 and London on 21 and 22 October, according to the BBC website, contestants could also audition in Cardiff and Belfast.

Judging Panel
Sisco Gomez, Louise Redknapp, Nigel Lythgoe and Arlene Phillips all returned to the judging panel for series two. Singer and The X Factor winner Alexandra Burke appeared as a guest judge during the audition stages. Singer and actor John Barrowman appeared as a guest judge during week six of the live shows, in place of Lythgoe.

Finals

Top 20 dancers

Male contestants

Female contestants

Elimination chart

Performance nights

Week 1 (16 April 2011)

Group dances:

Top 20: "Don't Stop The Music"—Rihanna (Jazz; Choreographer: Mandy Moore)
Top 10 Boys: "It's A Man's Man's Man's World"—James Brown (Contemporary; Choreographer: Sarah Boulter)
Top 10 Girls: "Fighter"—Christina Aguilera" (Lyrical jazz; Choreographer: Kevan Allen)
No eliminations were scheduled for this week.

Week 2 (23 April 2011)
Group dance (Top 20): "Toxic"—Britney Spears (Yael Naim cover) (Jazz; Choreographer: Beth Honan)
Couple dances:

Musical guest: "Feeling Good"—Jennifer Hudson
Solos:

Eliminated:
Ryan Jenkins
Paige Smith
New partners:
Stephanie Powell and Gian Luca Loddo

Week 3 (30 April 2011)
Group dance (Top 18): "River Deep Mountain High" by Tina Turner (Royal Wedding-themed; Choreographer: Mandy Moore)
Couple dances:

Musical guest: "I Can"—Blue
Solos:

Eliminated:
Stephanie Powell
Gian Luca Loddo

Week 4 (7 May 2011)
Group dance (Top 16): "You Can't Stop the Beat" from Hairspray (Broadway; Choreographer: Karen Bruce)
Couple dances:

Musical guest: "Gold Forever"/"All Time Low"/"Heart Vacancy" Medley – The Wanted
Solos:

Eliminated:
Alice Woodhouse
Charlie Wheeller

Week 5 (14 May 2011)

Group dance (Top 14): "Born This Way" – Lady Gaga (Jazz; Choreographer: Tyce Diorio)
Couple dances:

Musical guest: "Nobody's Perfect" – Jessie J
Solos:

Eliminated:
Danielle Cato
Shane Collard
Lee Crowley
Rithy Pereira
New partners:
Katie Love and Luke Jackson

Week 6 (21 May 2011)
Group dance (Top 10): "Work" – Kelly Rowland (Commercial; Choreographer: Beth Honan)
Couple dances:

Musical guest: "Notorious" – The Saturdays
Solos:

Eliminated:
Katrina Lyndon
Tom Shilcock

Week 7 (28 May 2011)
Group dances:
Top 8: "Rolling in the Deep" – Adele (Contemporary; Choreographer: Katrin Hall)
Girls: "Dr Feelgood" – Aretha Franklin (Jazz; Choreographer: Sean Cheesman)
Boys: "Another One Bites the Dust" – Queen (Jazz; Choreographer: Mandy Moore)
Couple dances:

Solos:

Musical guest: "Don't Stop the Party" – Black Eyed Peas
Bottom 4 Solos:

Eliminated:
Charlotte Scally
Israel Donowa

Week 8 (4 June 2011)
Group dances:
Top 6: "Yes" – Merry Clayton (TBA; Choreographer: TBA)
Girls: "The Rose" – Bette Midler (Contemporary; Choreographer: Mandy Moore)
Boys: "He's a Pirate" from 'Pirates of the Caribbean' (Paso Doble; Choreographer: Katya Virshilas)
Couple dances:

Solos:

Group dance: "Proud Mary" – The cast of 'Glee (TV series)' (Broadway; Choreographer: Bill Deamer)
Musical guest: "Still Got Tonight" – Matthew Morrison
Bottom 4 Solos:

Eliminated:
Bethany Rose Harrison
Lee Bridgman

Week 9 (Final) (11 June 2011)

Group dances:
Top 4: "Don't Stop Me Now" – Queen (Pop Jazz; Choreographer: TBA)
Top 2 Boys: "Puttin' On the Ritz" – Fred Astaire (Broadway Tap; Choreographer: Bill Deamer)
Top 2 Girls: "Defying Gravity" – from Wicked (Broadway; Choreographer: Karen Bruce)
Couples dance 1:

Solos:

Couples dance 2:

Top 20 Group dance: "Party Rock Anthem" – LMFAO feat. Lauren Bennett & GoonRock (Jazz; Choreographer: Mandy Moore)
Musical guest: "On The Floor" – Jennifer Lopez feat. Pitbull
Eliminated:
Katie Love
Kirsty Swain
Runner-Up:
Luke Jackson
Winner:
Matt Flint

Ratings
Overnight ratings are taken from Digital Spy and official ratings are taken from BARB.

References

External links

2011 British television seasons
So You Think You Can Dance (British TV series)

no:So You Think You Can Dance (UK)
pl:So You Think You Can Dance (Wielka Brytania)